The Maxwell Air Force Base Senior Officer's Quarters Historic District is an  historic district on Maxwell Air Force Base in Montgomery, Alabama.  It includes 150 contributing buildings, most of them houses for Air Force senior officers.  They are built in the French Provincial architectural style and date to the 1930s.  The district was placed on the National Register of Historic Places on March 2, 1988.

References

National Register of Historic Places in Montgomery, Alabama
Historic districts in Montgomery, Alabama
French Provincial architecture in Alabama
Historic districts on the National Register of Historic Places in Alabama